Volume of Sacred Law (VSL) (also known as the Book of the Law) is the Masonic term for whatever religious or philosophical texts are displayed during a Lodge meeting.

Background
In Lodges with a membership of mixed religions it is common to find more than one sacred text displayed. 
Every candidate is given his choice of religious text for his Obligation according to his beliefs.

One of the most notable individual VSLs is the George Washington Inaugural Bible.  It belongs to St. John's Lodge No. 1 in New York City and has been used at its meetings since 1767. It is famous, however, for being the Bible used at the first inauguration of George Washington as President of the United States.  It was also used (sometimes in conjunction with another Bible) for the Presidential inaugurations of Warren Harding, Dwight Eisenhower, George H. W. Bush, and Jimmy Carter.

References

Freemasonry